Andrej Strmiska (born 22 October 1996) is a Slovak male track cyclist, representing Slovakia at international competitions. He competed at the 2016 UEC European Track Championships in the elimination race event.

References

1996 births
Living people
Slovak male cyclists
Slovak track cyclists
Place of birth missing (living people)
European Games competitors for Slovakia
Cyclists at the 2019 European Games